Hastings Rail Bridge is a vertical-lift bridge that spans the Mississippi River in Hastings, Minnesota. It is one of only four lift spans on the Mississippi River, the others being at Hannibal, Missouri, Burlington, Iowa and in downtown St. Paul, Minnesota. It was built in 1981 by Milwaukee Road and was designed by Howard, Needles, Tammen & Bergendoff.

It crosses the Mississippi river in a north–south orientation from Hastings just upstream of Point Douglas, where the Saint Croix River empties into the Mississippi river.  In addition to CP Rail traffic, the bridge also carries Amtrak's Empire Builder across the river.

Another nearby lift bridge is the Prescott BNSF lift bridge, in Prescott, Wisconsin that crosses the St. Croix River.  The two tracks converge at the St. Croix interlocking tower.

See also
List of crossings of the Upper Mississippi River

References

External links 
 

Vertical lift bridges in Minnesota
Railroad bridges in Minnesota
Bridges over the Mississippi River
Bridges completed in 1981
Buildings and structures in Hastings, Minnesota
Chicago, Milwaukee, St. Paul and Pacific Railroad
Canadian Pacific Railway bridges in the United States
Transportation in Dakota County, Minnesota